Baskam Chal (also Romanized as Bāskam Chāl) is a village in Heyran Rural District, in the Central District of Astara County, Gilan Province, Iran. At the 2006 census, its population was 22, in 5 families.

References 

Populated places in Astara County